The Mid-Atlantic Region is one of ten United States regions that currently sends teams to the Little League World Series, the largest youth baseball tournament in the world. The Mid-Atlantic Region's participation in the LLWS dates back to 1957, when it was known as the East Region. However, when the LLWS doubled in size from 8 to 16 teams in 2001, with the number of US teams expanding from 4 to 8, the East Region was split into the New England and Mid-Atlantic Regions.

The Mid-Atlantic Region consists of Washington, D.C. and three Mid-Atlantic states:

Two other states, Virginia and West Virginia, are included in some definitions of the Mid-Atlantic region, but for purposes of the Little League World Series are included in the Southeast region.

Following the 2021 LLWS, New Jersey and New York has been moved to a newly created Metro Region. The latter region is one of the two new U.S. regions to be created as part of a planned expansion of the LLWS from 16 to 20 teams. This expansion was originally scheduled to occur for 2021, but was delayed to 2022 due to the COVID-19 pandemic.

Regional championship

Winner is indicated in green.

2001–2021

2022–present

LLWS results
As of the 2022 Little League World Series.

Results by state
As of the 2022 Little League World Series. Italics indicates the state is no longer a member of the Mid-Atlantic Region.

References

External links
Official site
Mid-Atlantic Region Little League Tournament Historical Results

Mid-Atlantic
Sports in the Mid-Atlantic states
Baseball competitions in the United States